The 2017 Chinese U-18 League is an association football league season that started on 4 March 2017 and ended on 12 June 2017.

Phase 1
2017 Chinese U-18 League Phase 1 started on 4 March 2017 with 17 teams participating in this phase.

Group A

Group B

Group C

Phase 2
2017 Chinese U-18 League Phase 2 started on 4 June 2017. Guangxi Beihai No.9 High School U-18 and Lijiang Yuanheng U-18 decided not to participate in this phase. Qingdao Jonoon U-18 joined in this phase. Dalian Yifang U-18 withdrew after the first match due to flu.

Division A

Group A

Group B

Division B

Group C

Group D

Classification round

1-4 Classification

5-7 Classification

8-11 Classification

12-15 Classification

References

2017 in Chinese football